Stella Churchill FRCS LRCP (1883–1954), was a British medical psychologist and psychotherapist who specialised in the health of women and children.

Early life 
She was born Stella Myers on 5 June 1883 in Edgbaston, Birmingham, the daughter of George Myers (b. 1841) and Flora Wertheimer (1851–1921). She was the great granddaughter of Chief Rabbi Akiba Wertheimer, and great niece of German philosopher Constantin Brunner. Her brother Walter was an eminent physician and parasitologist, and her sister Violet was a classical singer.

She married British diplomat Sidney Churchill on 31 October 1908 from whom she later separated. They had a son, George (b. 1910), and a daughter, Ruth Isabella (1912–1998),  Her sister Violet married William Algernon Churchill, one of her husband's brothers.

Education 
After Edgbaston High School she went to Girton College Cambridge to read Natural Science, graduating in 1905. Following her marriage in 1908 she went on to read medicine at the London School of Medicine for Women. She obtained a Diploma in Public Health in Cambridge in 1921.

Career 
After qualifying as a doctor in 1917 she held junior posts at the Hospital for Sick Children, Great Ormond Street, the Victoria Hospital for Children, and the Italian Hospital, before being appointed anaesthetist to the British Red Cross Hospital at Netley in 1918. She was Assistant Medical Officer for Health for Maternity and Child Welfare at Bermondsey from 1920–22, and First Assistant then Deputy Medical Officer for Health for St Pancras from 1922–24.

She was a Fellow of the Maternity and Child Welfare Group of the Society of Medical Officers of Health and served as its President.  She was a keen supporter of the Save the Children Fund and served on its council.

She retired from public health service and became interested in medical psychology and was appointed psychotherapist to the Tavistock Clinic and the West End Hospital for Nervous Diseases.

Churchill took a strong interest in infertility, sexually transmitted diseases, and eugenics and was a member of the Eugenics Society serving on its committee from 1931.

She lived at Strand Green House, No 1 Strand-on-the-Green, Chiswick, from about 1923–32 where her houseguests included the writer 'Elizabeth' Mary Beauchamp, author Margaret Kennedy who used Strand Green House in her book The Constant Nymph, and sculptor Joseph Armitage. She opened the first local child welfare clinic at Strand on the Green School.

She wrote many books on maternity and child welfare.

Public life 
From 1925–32 she represented South East Southwark on the London County Council. She was Parliamentary Labour Candidate for Hackney North in 1924 and for Brentford and Chiswick in 1929.

Death 
She died on 16 September 1954 in Menton, France aged 71.

Bibliography 
Nursing in the Home, including first aid in common emergencies, Modern Health Books, 1925
The Hygiene Of Life And Safer Motherhood,  Edited by Sir W Arbuthnot Lane, plus Sir William Wilcox, Sir R Armstrong-Jones, Sir B Bruce-Porter; Dr E Sloan Chesser; Dr Stella Churchill; Dr Caleb W Saleeby; et al. 1925
Health Services and the Public, Noel Douglas, London, 1928
On being a mother, Gollancz 1936
The Adolescent and the Family, London, The Cresset Press, 1949
Ailments of Childhood - A Vintage Article on Appendicitis, Colds, Fevers, Tuberculosis and Other Childhood Ailments, Hughes Press

References

External links 
Photograph of Dr Stella Churchill at The National Portrait Gallery

1883 births
1954 deaths
British Jews
British people of Polish-Jewish descent
British psychologists
British psychotherapists
Members of London County Council
Alumni of Girton College, Cambridge
Labour Party (UK) parliamentary candidates
Labour Party (UK) councillors
20th-century British psychologists
English eugenicists
Women councillors in England